The 2018 Big West Conference women's soccer tournament was the postseason women's soccer tournament for the Big West Conference held on November 1 and 5, 2018. The three-match tournament took place at Anteater Stadium in Irvine, California. The four-team single-elimination tournament consisted of two rounds based on seeding from regular season conference play. The defending champions were the Cal State Fullerton Titans, but they failed to qualify for the 2018 tournament. The Long Beach State won the title by beating the UC Santa Barbara Gauchos 1–0 in the final. This was the fourth Big West tournament title for the Long Beach State program and the fourth for head coach Mauricio Ingrassia.

Bracket

Schedule

Semifinals

Final

Statistics

Goalscorers 

2 Goals
 Dana Fujikuni - Long Beach State

1 Goal
 Ashley Gonzales - Long Beach State
 Hannah Wwndelken - UC Stanta Barbara

See also 
 Big West Conference
 2018 NCAA Division I women's soccer season
 2018 NCAA Division I Women's Soccer Tournament
 2018 Big West Conference Men's Soccer Tournament

References

External links 
2018 Big West Women's Soccer Tournament

Big West Conference Women's Soccer Tournament
2018 Big West Conference women's soccer season